The following outline is provided as an overview of and topical guide to nuclear technology:

Nuclear technology – involves the reactions of atomic nuclei. Among the notable nuclear technologies are nuclear power, nuclear medicine, and nuclear weapons. It has found applications from smoke detectors to nuclear reactors, and from gun sights to nuclear weapons.

Essence of nuclear technology 

 Atomic nucleus

Branches of nuclear technology 
 Nuclear engineering

History of nuclear technology 

 History of nuclear power

History of nuclear weapons

Nuclear material 

 Nuclear fuel
 Fertile material
 Thorium
 Uranium
 Enriched uranium
 Depleted uranium
 Plutonium
 Deuterium
 Tritium

Nuclear power 

Nuclear power – 
 List of nuclear power stations
 Nuclear reactor technology
 Fusion power
 Inertial fusion power plant
 Reactor types
 List of nuclear reactors
Advanced gas-cooled reactor
Boiling water reactor
Fast breeder reactor
Fast neutron reactor
Gas-cooled fast reactor
Generation IV reactor
Integral Fast Reactor
Lead-cooled fast reactor
Liquid-metal-cooled reactor
Magnox reactor
Molten salt reactor
Pebble bed reactor
Pressurized water reactor
Sodium-cooled fast reactor
Supercritical water reactor
Very high temperature reactor
 Radioisotope thermoelectric generator
 Radioactive waste
 Future energy development
 Nuclear propulsion
 Nuclear thermal rocket
 Polywell
 Nuclear decommissioning
 Nuclear power phase-out

Civilian nuclear accidents 
 List of civilian nuclear accidents
 List of civilian radiation accidents

Nuclear medicine 

Nuclear medicine – 
 BNCT
 Brachytherapy
 Gamma (Anger) Camera
 PET
 Proton therapy
 Radiation therapy
 SPECT
 Tomotherapy

Nuclear weapons 

Nuclear weapons – 
 Nuclear explosion
 Effects of nuclear explosions
 Types of nuclear weapons
 Strategic nuclear weapon
 ICBM
 SLBM
 Tactical nuclear weapons
 List of nuclear weapons
 Nuclear weapons systems
 Nuclear weapons delivery (missiles, etc.)
 Nuclear weapon design
 Nuclear weapons proliferation
 Nuclear weapons testing
 List of states with nuclear weapons
 List of nuclear tests
 Nuclear strategy
 Assured destruction
 Counterforce, Countervalue
 Decapitation strike
 Deterrence
 Doctrine for Joint Nuclear Operations
 Fail-deadly
 Force de frappe
 First strike, Second strike
 Game theory & wargaming
 Massive retaliation
 Minimal deterrence
 Mutual assured destruction (MAD)
 No first use
 National Security Strategy of the United States
 Nuclear attribution
 Nuclear blackmail
 Nuclear proliferation
 Nuclear utilization target selection (NUTS)
 Single Integrated Operational Plan (SIOP)
 Strategic bombing
 Nuclear weapons incidents
 List of sunken nuclear submarines
 United States military nuclear incident terminology
 1950 British Columbia B-36 crash
 1950 Rivière-du-Loup B-50 nuclear weapon loss incident
 1958 Mars Bluff B-47 nuclear weapon loss incident
 1961 Goldsboro B-52 crash
 1961 Yuba City B-52 crash
 1964 Savage Mountain B-52 crash
 1965 Philippine Sea A-4 incident
 1966 Palomares B-52 crash
 1968 Thule Air Base B-52 crash
 2007 United States Air Force nuclear weapons incident

Nuclear technology scholars 
 Henri Becquerel
 Niels Bohr
 James Chadwick
 John Cockcroft
 Pierre Curie
 Marie Curie
 Albert Einstein
 Michael Faraday
 Enrico Fermi
 Otto Hahn
 Lise Meitner
 Robert Oppenheimer
 Wolfgang Pauli
 Franco Rasetti
 Ernest Rutherford
 Ernest Walton

See also 

 Outline of energy
 Outline of nuclear power
 List of civilian nuclear ships
 List of military nuclear accidents
 List of nuclear medicine radiopharmaceuticals
 List of nuclear waste treatment technologies
 List of particles
 Anti-nuclear movement

External links 

 Nuclear Energy Institute – Beneficial Uses of Radiation
 Nuclear Technology

Nuclear technology
Nuclear technology
outline
Outline of nuclear technology